Allison Petra Cook-Tranquilli (born 12 August 1972 in Melbourne, Victoria) is a retired female basketball player from Australia, who played for the Melbourne Tigers and PVSK Pecs in Hungary. A two-time Olympian she was a member of the national women's team that claimed the bronze medal at the 1996 Summer Olympics in Atlanta, Georgia. She attended the Australian Institute of Sport in 1990–1991.

See also
 WNBL Top Shooter Award
 WNBL Rookie of the Year Award

References

External links
 
 
 
 

1972 births
Living people
Australian women's basketball players
Basketball players at the 1996 Summer Olympics
Basketball players at the 2004 Summer Olympics
Olympic basketball players of Australia
Olympic bronze medalists for Australia
Olympic silver medalists for Australia
Sportswomen from Victoria (Australia)
Olympic medalists in basketball
Australian Institute of Sport basketball (WNBL) players
Medalists at the 2004 Summer Olympics
Basketball players from Melbourne
Medalists at the 1996 Summer Olympics